AviaBellanca Aircraft Corporation was an American aircraft design and manufacturing company. Prior to 1983, it was known as the Bellanca Aircraft Company. The company was founded in 1927 by Giuseppe Mario Bellanca, although it was preceded by previous businesses and partnerships in which aircraft with the Bellanca name were produced, including Wright-Bellanca, in which he was in partnership with Wright Aeronautical.

In 2021 the company was reformed as Bellanca Aircraft, Inc and located in Sulphur, Oklahoma. The new company supplies maintenance and aircraft parts, for the legacy Cruisemaster and Viking aircraft.

History
After Giuseppe Mario Bellanca, the designer and builder of Italy's first aircraft, moved to the United States in 1911, he began to design aircraft for a number of firms, including the Maryland Pressed Steel Company, Wright Aeronautical Corporation and the Columbia Aircraft Corporation. Bellanca founded his own company, Bellanca Aircraft Corporation of America, in 1927, sited first in Richmond Hill, New York and moving in 1928 to New Castle (Wilmington), Delaware. In the 1920s and 1930s, Bellanca's aircraft of his own design were known for their efficiency and low operating cost, gaining fame for world record endurance and distance flights. Lindbergh's first choice for his New York to Paris flight was a Bellanca WB-2. The company's insistence on selecting the crew drove Lindbergh to Ryan.

Bellanca remained president and chairman of the board from the corporation's inception on the last day of 1927 until he sold the company to L. Albert and Sons in 1954. From that time on, the Bellanca line was part of a succession of companies that maintained the lineage of the original aircraft produced by Bellanca.

Aircraft

Famous individual aircraft
Lituanica
Miss Veedol
The American Nurse

See also
 American Champion
 Bellanca Airfield
 Bush plane

References

Citations

Bibliography
 Mondey, David. The Complete Illustrated Encyclopedia of the World's Aircraft. Secaucus, NJ: Chartwell Books Inc, 1978. .
 Palmer, Trisha, ed. "Bellanca Viking Series". Encyclopedia of the World's Commercial and Private Aircraft. New York: Crescent Books, 2001. .

External links

 AviaBellanca Aircraft Corporation website archives on Archive.org
 Friends of Bellanca Field
 The main focus of the George J. Frebert collection on Delaware aviation  and the George J. Frebert photograph collection on Delaware aviation — ''both about Giuseppe Bellanca & his Bellanca Aircraft Corporation; in the Hagley Museum and Library.
 The Story of Bellanca Planes – Popular Aviation

Aircraft manufacturers of the United States
Companies based in Minnesota
Defunct manufacturing companies based in Delaware
Douglas County, Minnesota
History of Omaha, Nebraska
1927 establishments in New York (state)